Josh Caygill (born 22 June 1989) is a British racing driver currently racing in the British Touring Car Championship for AmD with AutoAid/RCIB Insurance Racing and the Blancpain GT Series Sprint Cup for Team Parker Racing.

Racing record

Complete Blancpain GT Series Sprint Cup results

Complete British Touring Car Championship results
(key) (Races in bold indicate pole position – 1 point awarded just in first race; races in italics indicate fastest lap – 1 point awarded all races; * signifies that driver led race for at least one lap – 1 point given all races)

Complete European Le Mans Series results 
(key) (Races in bold indicate pole position; results in italics indicate fastest lap)

References

External links
 Official site

1989 births
Living people
British Touring Car Championship drivers
English racing drivers
British racing drivers
Blancpain Endurance Series drivers
Porsche Carrera Cup GB drivers

Audi Sport drivers
W Racing Team drivers
United Autosports drivers
24H Series drivers